The Yavne-Yam ostracon, also known as the Mesad Hashavyahu ostracon, is an ostracon containing a written appeal by a field worker to the fortress's governor regarding the confiscation of his cloak, which the writer considers to have been unjust. The artefact was found in 1960 by Joseph Naveh at Mesad Hashavyahu, near Yavne-Yam. The inscription is known as KAI 200.

The genre of the inscription is the subject of debate, and it was identified by different scholars as a letter, legal document, extrajudicial petition addressed to a king  or  his  subordinate  or even as a poem. In the inscription, the worker makes his appeal to the governor on the basis of both the garment's undeserved confiscation and by implication, the biblical law regarding holding past sundown a person's cloak as collateral for a debt (cf. ).  Although the petition does not specifically cite the law, it would have been commonly known by rulers and peasants alike. Some scholars argue that the ostracon bears the first known extra-Biblical reference to the Hebrew Sabbath day of rest, but the issue is debated.

Concerning who was in control of this area of the Philistine Plain, Shmuel Ahituv states, "The letter is written in good biblical Hebrew, plus a possible scribal omission here or there, and the script is that of a trained scribe. The work supervisor mentioned in the text bears a clearly Judaean name, Hoshavyahu. All these factors point to a time of Judaean control over the area."  Naveh agrees, "The four Hebrew inscriptions together testify to this fortress having been under Judaean control at the time. ... It seems likely that Josiah placed a military governor in charge of the fortress, and that the force garrisoned there was supplied with provisions by the peasants living in the unwalled settlements in the vicinity."

The ostracon was found under the floor of a room adjacent to the guardhouse/gate complex, is approximately 20 cm high by 16.5 cm wide, and contains 14 visible lines of text. In all, seven key artifacts were recovered, six of them inscribed ostraca in the Hebrew language. Pottery shards in the layer above represented Greek (early Ionian/Southwest Anatolian) or Persian-period pottery. The ostraca from this site are currently located in the Israel Museum at Jerusalem.

Inscription

Translation 
The following is an edited translation of the ostracon, which is composed of fourteen lines in Hebrew:

"Let my lord, the governor, hear the word of his servant! Your servant is a reaper.  Your servant was in Hazar Asam, and your servant reaped, and he finished, and he was storing up (the grain) during these days before the Sabbath. When your servant had finished the harvest, and was storing (the grain) during these days, Hoshavyahu came, the son of Shobi, and he seized the garment of your servant, when I had finished my harvest. It (is already now some) days (since) he took the garment of your servant. And all my companions can bear witness for me - they who reaped with me in the heat of the harvest - yes, my companions can bear witness for me. Amen! I am innocent from guilt. And he stole my garment! It is for the governor to give back the garment of his servant. So grant him mercy in that you return the garment of your servant and do not be displeased."

Due to breaks in the ostracon and a missing lower right section, Naveh states that there are too few letters available in line 13 to make an educated guess what it said. The same might likely be said of lines 11 through 14, which have been reconstructed, and a line 15 which is missing.

References

External links
 Mezad Hashavyahu Ostracon 
 Yavneh Yam Ostracon

1960 archaeological discoveries
Hebrew inscriptions
KAI inscriptions
Ostracon
Collections of the Israel Museum